Göran Therborn FAcSS (23 September 1941, Kalmar, Sweden) is a professor of sociology at Cambridge University and is amongst the most highly cited contemporary Marxian-influenced sociologists. He has published widely in journals such as the New Left Review, and is notable for his writing on topics that fall within the general political and sociological framework of post-Marxism. Topics on which he has written extensively include the intersection between the class structure of society and the function of the state apparatus, the formation of ideology within subjects, and the future of the Marxist tradition. Therborn was awarded the 2019 Lenin Award.

Education
Therborn was born in 1941 into a landowning family. He graduated from the gymnasium in Hanseatic Kalmar in 1960. He attended Lund University in Sweden, where he received a Fil. Dr. in 1974.

Works
In his book The Ideology of Power and the Power of Ideology (1980) Therborn departs from Louis Althusser's writings on the formation of ideology by addressing ideological change, the ideological constitution of classes, and ideological domination. He develops a material matrix of ideologies, and a general outline of how ideologies are formed from a post-Marxist perspective.

From Marxism to Post Marxism? (2008), attempts to convey in a relatively small amount of space a comprehensive history of the development of Marxist theory and the trajectory of Marxist thought in the 21st century.

See also
 Marxism
 Post-Marxism
 Social Class
 Sociology

Bibliography
 
 
  (Reprinted as Radical Thinkers Series, Verso (2008)
 (Reprinted as Verso Classic (1999)
 
 
 
 
  Details.

References

External links
 Cambridge University Department of Sociology: Academic Profile of Göran Therborn

Swedish sociologists
1941 births
Living people
Left Party (Sweden)
Fellows of the Academy of Social Sciences